Đorđe Bašanović (born 31 July 1996) is a Serbian football defender who plays for Proleter Novi Sad in Serbian SuperLiga.

Honours
Čukarički
Serbian Cup: 2014–15

References

External links
 
 Đorđe Bašanović stats at utakmica.rs
 Đorđe Bašanović stats at footballdatabase.eu

1996 births
Living people
Footballers from Belgrade
Association football defenders
Serbian footballers
FK Brodarac players
FK Čukarički players
FK Zemun players
FK Rad players
FK Proleter Novi Sad players
Serbian SuperLiga players